Raejae Joseph is a U.S. Virgin Islands soccer player who plays for the Rider Broncs men's soccer program and the U.S. Virgin Islands national team.

Career 
Joseph played college soccer for the Rider Broncs. 

Joseph was first called up to the U.S. Virgin Islands national team on March 23, 2015 for a 2018 FIFA World Cup qualifier against Barbados, but did not see action. 

On September 9, 2018, Joseph made his senior debut for the Virgin Islands in a CONCACAF Nations League qualifier against Canada. Joseph played the entire match.

International goals
Scores and results list the United States Virgin Islands' goal tally first.

References

External links 
 

1997 births
Living people
United States Virgin Islands soccer players
United States Virgin Islands international soccer players
Association football forwards
Association football midfielders
Rider Broncs men's soccer players